Koijukari is a Swedish island located in Norrbotten, Sweden, belongs to the Haparanda archipelago. The island lies in the south of the Säivisviken, 2,5 kilometres south-east of Säivis. The island has no connection to the mainland, and there are no buildings on it.

See also 
  List of islands of the Haparanda archipelago

References

Islands of Sweden